The Geological Survey of Slovenia (abbreviated GeoZS) is the primary geological research institute of Slovenia. It was founded on May 7, 1946.

History
While Slovenia was part of Austro-Hungary, geological studies were carried out by the Imperial Geological Office (K. K. Geologischen Reichsanstalt), which is now the Federal Geological Office (Geologische Bundesanstalt) of Austria.

References

External links
Official website of the Geological Survey of Slovenia

Geology of Slovenia
Geological surveys